An exanthem is a widespread rash occurring on the outside of the body and usually occurring in children. An exanthem can be caused by toxins, drugs, or microorganisms, or can result from autoimmune disease.

The term exanthem is from the Greek . It can be contrasted with enanthems which occur inside the body, such as on mucous membranes.

Infectious exanthem
In 1905, the Russian-French physician Léon Cheinisse (1871–1924), proposed a numbered classification of the six most common childhood exanthems.

Of these six "classical" infectious childhood exanthems, four are viral. Numbers were provided in 1905.

The four viral exanthems have much in common, and are often studied together as a class. They are:

Scarlet fever, or "second disease", is associated with the bacterium Streptococcus pyogenes. Fourth disease, also known as "Dukes' disease" is a condition whose existence is not widely accepted today. It was described in 1900 and is postulated to be related to the bacterium Staphylococcus aureus.

In 1979 and 2001 a possible "seventh disease" was postulated following reports of a condition in Japan also referred to as acute febrile infantile mucocutaneous lymph node syndrome (MCLS).

Many other common viruses apart from the ones mentioned above can also produce an exanthem as part of their presentation, though they are not considered part of the classic numbered list:
 Varicella zoster virus (chickenpox or shingles)
 Mumps
 rhinovirus (the common cold)
 unilateral laterothoracic exanthem of childhood
 Some types of viral haemorrhagic fever are also known to produce a systemic rash of this kind during the progression of the disease.
 Tick-borne diseases like Rocky Mountain spotted fever produce a rash that may become extensive enough so as to be classified as exanthemous in as many as 90% of children with the disease.

See also
List of cutaneous conditions

References

External links 

Overview at About.com
Definition at MedTerms
Differential diagnosis 
Dermatology Quiz Includes photo, diagnosis, and treatment of unilateral laterothoracic exanthem (ULE).

Dermatologic terminology